is a 1964 Japanese comedy film directed by Kozo Saeki. The film was the eight film in the "Ekimae" series.  It was followed by Mumu Dance in 1964. Hot Spring Ghost is a comedy about battling resort operators.

The film was released on June 11, 1964 in Japan. It was the distributor Toho's highest-grossing film of the year and the eight highest-grossing film of 1964 in Japan. The film was released in the United States by Toho International in 1965 with English subtitles.

See also
 List of Japanese films of 1964

Notes

References

 

1964 films
1964 comedy films
Japanese comedy films
Toho films
1960s Japanese films